Troldspejlet (meaning the magic mirror) is a Danish television program that reviews and tells about upcoming films, video games, comics and books. The creator and editor, Jakob Stegelmann, is also the presenter.

Troldspejlet has been shown on Danish television channel DR1 since 1989, and uses the Gremlins 2 End Credits theme from the American horror-comedy film Gremlins 2: The New Batch as signature tune.

Primarily, the target group is children and adolescents. In 2019, the program was rebranded, now targeting adults and adolescents under the name Troldspejlet & Co.

Premise
Jakob Stegelmann reviews nerdy things, together with his team of nerds, consisting of Troels Møller, Ida Rud, Regitze Heiberg, Christopher Leo, and Benjamin Stegelmann. Formerly Jacob Ege Hinchely was a member, but he moved on with his career.

Reception
The series have been widely positive acclaimed for its contributions to pop culture in Denmark, and for being the first Danish critic entertainment program.

In 2006 Stegelmann received a new prize called the Nordic Game Prize, and was promised that the prize should be named after him from that day on, because of his "contribution to the coverage of computer games on Danish national television and his understanding of the relevance of the phenomenon of games to the entertainment culture", referring to Troldspejlet, the film magazine Planet X, and his many books about films, video games, and comics.

References

External links 
 Site on dr.dk (Danish)
 

Danish television shows
Television shows about video games
2010s Danish television series
2000s Danish television series
1990s Danish television series
1980s Danish television series
DR TV original programming